Senegal - Diocesi di Ziguinchor.jpg

The Roman Catholic Diocese of Ziguinchor is a diocese located in the city of Ziguinchor in the Ecclesiastical province of Dakar in Senegal.

History
 April 25, 1939: Established as Apostolic Prefecture of Ziguinchor from Apostolic Vicariate of Dakar
 July 10, 1952: Promoted as Apostolic Vicariate of Ziguinchor
 September 14, 1955: Promoted as Diocese of Ziguinchor

Special churches

 The cathedral is Cathédrale Saint Antoine de Padoue in Ziguinchor.

Bishops
 Prefects Apostolic of Ziguinchor (Roman rite)
 Fr. Giuseppe Fayec, C.S.Sp. (1939.05.31 – 1947)
 Fr. Prosper Dodds, C.S.Sp. (1947.06.13 – 1952.07.10 see below)
 Vicar Apostolic of Ziguinchor (Roman rite)
 Bishop Prosper Dodds, C.S.Sp. (see above 1952.07.10 – 1955.09.14 see below)
 Bishops of Ziguinchor (Roman rite)
 Bishop Prosper Dodds, C.S.Sp. (see above 1955.09.14 – 1966.02.15)
 Bishop Augustin Sagna (1966.09.29 – 1995.10.23)
 Bishop Maixent Coly (1995.10.23 – 2010.08.24)
 Bishop Paul Abel Mamba Diatta (2012.01.25 – 2021.11.04)

Coadjutor Bishop
Maixent Coly (1993-1995)

See also
Roman Catholicism in Senegal

Sources
 GCatholic.org
 Catholic Hierarchy

Ziguinchor
Christian organizations established in 1939
Roman Catholic dioceses and prelatures established in the 20th century
1939 establishments in Senegal
 
Roman Catholic Ecclesiastical Province of Dakar